28S ribosomal protein S30, mitochondrial is a protein that in humans is encoded by the MRPS30 gene.

Mammalian mitochondrial ribosomal proteins are encoded by nuclear genes and help in protein synthesis within the mitochondrion. Mitochondrial ribosomes (mitoribosomes) consist of a small 28S subunit and a large 39S subunit. They have an estimated 75% protein to rRNA composition compared to prokaryotic ribosomes, where this ratio is reversed. Another difference between mammalian mitoribosomes and prokaryotic ribosomes is that the latter contain a 5S rRNA. Among different species, the proteins comprising the mitoribosome differ greatly in sequence, and sometimes in biochemical properties, which prevents easy recognition by sequence homology. This gene encodes a 28S subunit protein that is similar to the chicken pro-apoptotic protein p52. Transcript variants using alternative promoters or polyA sites have been mentioned in the literature but the complete description of these sequences is not available.

References

Further reading

Ribosomal proteins